Jock Jams, Volume 1 is the first album in the Jock Jams compilation album series, released in July 1995.

Two years after this album was released, "Jock Jam Megamix" was released, containing songs from this album and the next two.

Track listing
A * denotes a song that has a smooth auditory transition to the next track (i.e. it overlaps 2 songs/phrases).

 Michael Buffer - "Let's Get Ready to Rumble"* 0:25 
 2 Unlimited - "Get Ready for This"  3:25
 Tag Team - "Whoomp! (There It Is)" 3:43
 Black Box - "Strike It Up" 3:35
 69 Boyz - "Tootsee Roll" 4:03
 "Pump It Up, Go 'Head, Go 'Head" 0:17
 K7 - "Come Baby Come" 3:55
 Rob Base and DJ E-Z Rock - "It Takes Two" 	4:32
 "Gridiron Groove" 0:16
 C&C Music Factory - "Gonna Make You Sweat (Everybody Dance Now)" 4:01
 Naughty by Nature - "Hip Hop Hooray" 3:51
 M/A/R/R/S   - "Pump Up the Volume" 3:58
 Snap! - "The Power" 4:12
 "Uh, Ungawaa!" 0:19
 EMF - "Unbelievable" 3:27
 Village People - "YMCA" 4:40
 Technotronic - "Pump Up the Jam" 3:58
 2 Unlimited - "Twilight Zone" 3:24
 Ray Castoldi - "The Old Ballgame" 0:38
 Gary Glitter - "Rock and Roll Part 2 (Hey Song)" 2:58

Charts

Weekly charts

Year-end charts

References

1995 debut albums
Jock series
1995 compilation albums
Dance music compilation albums